Tomice  is a village in the administrative district of Gmina Głogówek, within Prudnik County, Opole Voivodeship, in south-western Poland, close to the Czech border.

The village has a population of 114.

References

Tomice